Kate Kendall (born 27 July 1973) is an Australian actress and director. She played Angie Piper in the long-running Nine Network Australian drama Stingers from 1998 to 2004. Kendall has appeared in television series The Librarians (2007), Rush (2010) and Conspiracy 365. She joined the cast of television soap opera Neighbours in 2013 as Lauren Turner. After leaving the role in 2017, Kendall became a director, and later producer, on the serial.

Career
Kendall studied at the Centre for Performing Arts (CPA) (now the Adelaide College of the Arts) in Adelaide. There she was taught by her father, David Kendall, who then headed the acting course. Small parts in television shows such as Home and Away and Neighbours led to a guest role as Rosie Burgess in Blue Heelers in 1997. Her major television role has been as Angie Piper in Stingers, which role she played for 192 episodes from 1998 to 2004.

Kendall played a minor role as Lisa in the American mini-series The Starter Wife (2007) and also appeared in three episodes of the Australian produced comedy The Librarians (2007), as Jacinta McSweeney. Kendall appeared on the Australian drama Rush in 2010. In 2011 Kendall played the lead role of Diana in MTC's production of Next to Normal and appeared in the Australian musical premiere of An Officer and a Gentleman. She also played Emily Ormond in the twelve-part drama series Conspiracy 365, which was based on the book of the same name. Kendall took over the role of Lauren Carpenter on Neighbours in 2013. 

As she was wrapping up the role of Lauren in 2017, Kendall began directing small scenes. She has since directed numerous episodes of the series. In June 2020, it was announced that Kendall would become a producer. She is covering for series producer Natalie Lynch, who has gone on maternity leave. David Knox of TV Tonight believed Kendall was the show's first actor, director, producer.

Personal life
Kendall is married to former Carlton Football Club AFL player Wayne Johnston and has a son and four stepchildren.

References

External links

Living people
1973 births
Australian television actresses